Puhtu (also known as Puhtuaid) is a former islet and since the beginning of the 19th century a peninsula in western Estonia. Administratively it belongs to Virtsu small borough in Lääneranna Parish, Pärnu County.

Puhtu is covered by a speciose old broadleaf forest.

History
Puhtulaid (Holm Puchten, Holm zum Pucht) was first mentioned in 1478 when it belonged to the von Uexküll family. The first buildings were erected in the 18th century by the owner of Vana-Virtsu Manor, Carl Thure von Helwig. He designed Puhtu as a private resort with three Chinese-styled houses and alleys surrounded by hewn sculptures.

In 1813 Carl Thure von Helwig's widow Wilhelmine von Helwig ordered a memorial stone to a family friend, world-famous German poet Friedrich Schiller (1759–1805). It's reputedly the earliest extant monument to Schiller in the world. During the World War II the monument was heavily damaged but was restored by Paul Horma in 1958.

In 1857 a cattle manor building (now known as the Count's House) and a stable were built on Puhtu, both are extant today.

In the 19th century the island was connected to the continent by building a road with a bridge to Virtsu.

During the World War I Puhtu was used as a seaplane base by Russians. The soldiers and officers lived in the Puhtulaid's summerhouses. While retreating, all the summerhouses were demolished and the von Helwig family graves were plundered.

Puhtu was acquired by the professor of University of Hamburg biologist Jakob von Uexküll in 1927. 1929–1939 he spent nearly every summer some time in Puhtu. In the 1930s he built a new summerhouse on the southern end of the peninsula. In 1934 Jakob von Uexküll invited Count Alexander Keyserlingk, an amateur ornithologist as the guardian of Puhtu; he lived there until 1939.

In 1939 Puhtulaid and Adralaiud were taken under natural protection

After the World War II Puhtu was given to Tartu State University but shortly after that to Estonian Academy of Sciences. The latter opened an ornithological station headed by Eerik Kumari on Puhtu.

Besides the main building (Baron's House, summerhouse built by Jakob von Uexküll in the 1930s) the station consists of a laboratory and a birdwatching tower (built in the 1960s) and a guardian house (Count's House, the cattle manor building from 1857, used by Alexander Keyserlingk).

Since 1995 Puhtu belongs to the Matsalu National Park and from 1997 the station operates under the Estonian University of Life Sciences.

See also
Puhtu Biological Station
Puhtu-Laelatu Nature Reserve

Gallery

References

Zooloogia ja Botaanika Instituut. Teetähiseid Puhtu ajaloost (in Estonian)
Virtsu. Puhtu poolsaar (in Estonian)

Former islands of Estonia
Peninsulas of Estonia
Lääneranna Parish
Landforms of Lääne County